Nguyễn Diệu Huyền (born 28 March 2003), commonly known by her stage name Pháo,  is a Vietnamese rapper and producer. She grew up in Tuyên Quang, and lives in Hanoi as of 2021. The name Pháo was chosen by her as it symbolizes passion, although in an earlier interview she stated that it was derived from the name of a character in the sitcom Kim Chi Cà Pháo (Eggplant Kimchi). As of 2020, she was a student at the Hanoi College of Art.

Pháo started rapping around 2018. She has said she admires Cardi B and fellow Vietnamese rapper Kimmese. She wasn't known to the wider public until the song "2 Phút Hơn" with Vietnamese producer and DJ Masew [:vi:Masew], which garnered over 30 million views. The KAIZ remix of the latter song gained global popularity and topped the Shazam music chart. She also participated in the Vietnamese TV show "King of Rap". In 2021, she released a new version of "2 Phút Hơn" with the American rapper Tyga, who is of partial Vietnamese descent.

Discography

Singles 

 2 Phút Hơn (2020)
 Nói Dối (with HIEUTHUHAI)
 Sập (with Tez O.Alquimista and Megazetz) (2022)

See also 

 V-pop

References 

Vietnamese women rappers
2003 births
Living people
21st-century Vietnamese women